Alan John Nutter (6 December 1920 – 16 August 1994) was an Australian rules footballer who played for the Richmond Football Club in the Victorian Football League (VFL).

Nutter served in both the Australian Army and Royal Australian Navy in World War II.

References

External links 
 
 
 Alan Nutter's playing statistics from The VFA Project

1920 births
1994 deaths
Australian rules footballers from Melbourne
Richmond Football Club players
Brighton Football Club players
Australian Army personnel of World War II
Royal Australian Navy personnel of World War II
People from Brunswick, Victoria
Military personnel from Melbourne